Utah State Route 238 may refer to:
Utah State Route 238 (1945-1953)
Utah State Route 238 (1969-2007)